Borçka District is a district of Artvin Province of Turkey. Its seat is the town Borçka. Its area is 805 km2, and its population is 22,030 (2021).

Composition
There is one municipality in Borçka District:
 Borçka

There are 38 villages in Borçka District:

 Adagül
 Akpınar
 Alaca
 Ambarlı
 Aralık
 Arkaköy
 Atanoğlu
 Avcılar
 Balcı
 Boğazköy
 Camili
 Çavuşlu
 Çaylıköy
 Çifteköprü
 Civan
 Demirciler
 Düzenli
 Düzköy
 Efeler
 Fındıklı
 Güneşli
 Güreşen
 Güzelyurt
 İbrikli
 Kale
 Karşıköy
 Kayadibi
 Kayalar
 Kaynarca
 Maralköy
 Muratlı
 Örücüler
 Şerefiye
 Taraklı
 Uğurköy
 Yeşilköy
 Zedoban
 Zorlu

References

Districts of Artvin Province